Western Yell County School District is public school district based in the rural, distant community of Havana, Arkansas, United States. The school district provides early childhood, elementary and secondary education from prekindergarten through grade 12. The district encompasses  of land, in western Yell County, to include the following communities: Havana, Belleville, and a part of Corinth. It is the smallest of four public school districts in Yell County with two facilities and serving approximately 500 students per year.

History
Western Yell County School District was formed on 1 July 1985 by the consolidation of the former Belleville School District and Havana School District.

In 2012, Western Yell County High School was nationally recognized as a silver medalist in the Best High Schools Report developed by U.S. News & World Report. The school was ranked No. 1,746 in the nation and No. 15 in the state.

Schools 
 Western Yell County High School – serving students in grades 7 through 12.
 Western Yell County Elementary School – serving students in prekindergarten through grade 6.

See also 
 List of school districts in Arkansas

References

Further reading
These include maps of predecessor districts:
 (Download)

External links 
 

School districts in Arkansas
Education in Yell County, Arkansas
1985 establishments in Arkansas
School districts established in 1985